The Right Way is a 2004 Canadian film directed by Mark Penney. It tells the story of Amy and David two young people from suburbia, whose lives are going nowhere, when they meet their relationship alters their lives forever and sends them surreal and existential crisis. The Right Way was an Official Selection of the 2004 Venice Film Festival and had a limited theatrical release in the United States in December 2005, it was released to video on demand services in 2010.

The film was shot in Brampton, Ontario.

Critical reception
A review in The Globe and Mail called The Right Way, "an old-fashioned, grim Canadian movie" that "despite its paramount flows... marks the birth of a promising young director."  The reviewer for the National Post wrote that despite the fact that the "message is powerful and the production values fantastic (the film was shot for $10,000 but looks like it cost at least 10 times as much), The Right Way suffers from thinly developed characters...  and a railroad-straight plot.

Cast
 Karyn Dwyer - Amy
 Jefferson Brown - David
 Gloria Slade - Amy's Mom
 James McGowan - Dad
 Holly Dennison - Mom
 Sarain Boylan - Lori
 Keir Gilchrist - Young David

References

External links

 

2004 films
English-language Canadian films
Canadian comedy-drama films
Canadian sex comedy films
Films shot in Ontario
2004 comedy-drama films
Films directed by Mark Penney
2004 directorial debut films
2000s English-language films
2000s Canadian films